Mehmet Fuat Umay (1885 – 1963) was a Turkish physician, member of parliament, and politician, who was known to tour the United States after the Turkish War of Independence, in an attempt to raise donations for the orphans in Turkey.

References 

1885 births
1963 deaths
People from Kırklareli
Republican People's Party (Turkey) politicians
Members of the Grand National Assembly of Turkey
20th-century Turkish politicians
20th-century Turkish physicians